Asfyj (also Romanized as Āsfyj, Asfij, Āsfīj, and Esfīj; also known as Āsfīch, Aspish, and Esfīch) is a village in Asfyj Rural District of Asfyj District, Behabad County, Yazd province, Iran. At the 2006 National Census, its population was 654 in 154 households, when it was in Behabad District of Bafq County. The following census in 2011 counted 739 people in 197 households, by which time the district had been elevated to the status of a county. The latest census in 2016 showed a population of 619 people in 203 households; it was the largest village in its rural district.

References 

Behabad County

Populated places in Yazd Province

Populated places in Behabad County